Aldo Marcos Miyashiro Ribeiro (Lima, Peru, February 9, 1976) is a Peruvian actor, screenwriter, playwright, film director and presenter. Known mainly for his roles as Caradura in the Misterio series and Tony Blades in the series La gran sangre, and also for leading his TV show La Banda del Chino. In addition, he is the director of the films Attacked: The Theory of Pain (2015), Once machos (2017), Bleed. Scream. Beat! (2017), Once machos 2 (2019) & Wake Show (2020)

Biography 
Aldo Miyashiro is of Peruvian and Japanese descent; studied at Colegio Champagnat (Lima, Peru). He was a student at the Pontificia Universidad Católica del Perú, after journalism at the Jaime Bausate y Meza School (where he began his theatrical activity) and acting at the ENSAD and the playwright's workshop Roberto Ángeles He is also a barrista for Club Universitario de Deportes.

In 2003, he premiered the play "A mystery, a passion", which he brought to television in 2004 as the miniseries "" Misterio "', where he performed to "Lock". The following year he starred in the miniseries  Lobos de Mar .

In March 2005 he married the actress and singer Érika Villalobos, with whom they have two children.

His next television job as an actor and screenwriter was the series  The Great Blood  where he played Tony Blades. The series lasted four seasons (from 2006 to 2007) for Frecuencia Latina. In 2007 the miniseries film was released: "The great blood: the film" '. In 2008 he debuted as a presenter of the late show "Enemigos Intimos" with Beto Ortiz by Frecuencia Latina. Two years later, the program moved to Panamericana Televisión under the name "'Enemigos Públicos"' '.

At the Festival FIL-Lima 2009, his book "'A mystery, a passion"' was the best seller with approximately 1000 copies.

Along with his work as a presenter, he acted and wrote the script for two miniseries, he competed in the dance reality show  El gran show , hosted by Gisela Valcárcel, where he obtained the fourth put after two months of competition.

He is currently working on the television program La Banda del Chino, directed by América Televisión.

Television

Mini series 
He acted and wrote the script for the following productions:
 Mystery (2005) as "Caradura" - Frecuencia Latina
 Sea wolf (2005) as Tony Blades - Frecuencia Latina
 The Great Blood (2006) as Tony Blades - Frecuencia Latina
 "The great blood 2: against the cursed goddesses" (2006) as Tony Blades - Frecuencia Latina.
 "The great blood 3: the final meeting" (2006) as Tony Blades - Frecuencia Latina.
 "Blow by blow" (2007) (special participation in the 1st episode) as Tony Blades - Frecuencia Latina.
 The Great Blood 4 (2007) as Tony Blades - Frecuencia Latina.
 Boy from my Neighborhood (series) (2010) as "Caradura" - Panamericana Televisión
 La Fuerza (2011) as Mayor Zero - Panamericana Televisión.
 Lords Papis (March 27 - July 23, 2019) as Ignacio Moreno - América Televisión.

Programs 
  Intimate enemies  (2008-2010), driving with Beto Ortiz -
  Public Enemies  (2010-2014), driving initially with Beto Ortiz, then with Sandra Vergara, and finally with Mónica Cabrejos - Panamericana Televisión.
  The great show: first season  (2011), participant "Hero" / 4th place - América Televisión.
  Spoiled  (2011), producer - Panamericana Televisión.
  Todos los bravos  (2012), producer - Panamericana Televisión.
  The Battery  (January 19, 2015 - April 1, 2016), driving with Viviana Rivasplata - Panamericana Televisión.
 The Chinese band (since January 23, 2017), driving - América Televisión.

References 

Peruvian people of Japanese descent
Peruvian dramatists and playwrights
Peruvian screenwriters
Male screenwriters
Peruvian male film actors
Peruvian male stage actors
Peruvian male television actors
1976 births
Living people